The 1st Wildflower Film Awards is an awards ceremony recognizing the achievements of Korean independent and low-budget films. It was held at the Literature House in Seoul on April 1, 2014, following five days of screenings at CGV Apgujeong Movie Collage in Seoul. Eligible films included some 60 features with budgets under  and 20 documentaries that received a theatrical release in Korea in the calendar year 2013.

Nominations and winners
(Winners denoted in bold)

References

External links 

Wildflower Film Awards at Koreanfilm.org

Wildflower Film Awards
Wildflower Film Awards
Wildflower Film Awards